"Tear-Stained Letter" is the opening track from Richard Thompson's 1983 album Hand of Kindness. The song has been recorded by others, notably a hit version by Jo-El Sonnier in 1988.

Content
With a strong zydeco feel, the song's length is 4 minutes and 44 seconds. The main riff is performed on saxophones by Pete Thomas and Pete Zorn, who also performs the background vocals, and on accordion by John Kirkpatrick. The coda features a duet between a sax solo, accordion solo, and guitar solo by Richard Thompson.

The song is in the key of G major, with a fast tempo in 4/4 time. It uses a chord pattern of E7-A-E7-A-D-G on the verses, and B7-C-D-G twice on the chorus.

The lyrics feature a narrator who breaks up with a tumultuous romantic partner: "Just when I thought that things would get better / Right through the door come a tear-stained letter".

Jo-El Sonnier version

Country music singer Jo-El Sonnier covered the song on his 1988 album Come On Joe. His version was released as a single in 1988, reaching number nine on the Hot Country Songs charts. Kenny Greenberg plays lead guitar on Sonnier's version. Actor Judge Reinhold appears in the music video for the song.

Charts

Weekly charts

Year-end charts

Other versions
Patty Loveless covered the song on her 1996 album The Trouble with the Truth.

Southside Johnny and The Asbury Jukes covered the song on their 2005 album Into the Harbour.

References

1983 songs
1988 singles
Richard Thompson (musician) songs
Jo-El Sonnier songs
Patty Loveless songs
Song recordings produced by Joe Boyd
RCA Records Nashville singles
Songs written by Richard Thompson (musician)